The 2007 Country Music Association Award, 41st Ceremony, was held on November 7, 2007, at the Sommet Center (later the Bridgestone Arena) in Nashville, Tennessee. The ceremony did not feature a host, but artists and guests introduced and presented awards throughout the evening. Brad Paisley, George Strait led the night with 5 nominations each including, Album of the Year and Entertainer of the Year.

Winners and nominees

Winners are shown in bold.

Hall of Fame

Performers

Presenters 

James Denton - introduced Miranda Lambert, George Strait, and Taylor Swift
Sara Evans - introduced Brad Paisley, Alison Krauss, Big & Rich, and Rodney Atkins
Kate Walsh - introduced Carrie Underwood, Brooks & Dunn, and Jason Aldean
Vince Gill - introduced The Eagles
Dwight Yoakam - introduced Sugarland
LeAnn Rimes - introduced Martina McBride, Keith Urban, Reba McEntire, and recognized the Country Music Hall of Fame Inductees
Kimberly Williams-Paisley - introduced Kenny Chesney, Josh Turner, Kellie Pickler, and Rascal Flatts with Jamie Foxx

References 

Country Music Association
CMA
Country Music Association Awards
Country Music Association Awards
November 2007 events in the United States
2007 awards in the United States
21st century in Nashville, Tennessee
Events in Nashville, Tennessee